Pigafetta is a genus of two palm species in the family Arecaceae.

They are native to the Maluku Islands, Sulawesi, and New Guinea where they grow near rivers and in forest clearings up to 900 m in elevation.  It is named for Antonio Pigafetta and is sometimes misspelled as Pigafettia.  Thought to contain only one species, in 1994 it was recognized to have two; P. elata and P. filaris, both of which are among the fastest growing palms.

Description
These dioecious palms have green, solitary trunks with widely spaced leaf scar rings. The trunks grow to 45 cm in diameter and 35 m in height; the leaf crown is hemispherical, or nearly so, with 6 m pinnate leaves on robust, 2 m petioles.  Petioles are armed with 6 cm spines, gold or gray in color.  Inflorescences emerge from within the leaf crown, to 2 m in length, and resemble those in Mauritia.  The fruit ripens to a yellow-orange drupe, covered in scales and containing one seed.

References

Calamoideae
Arecaceae genera
Dioecious plants